Uroš Stamatović (Serbian Cyrillic: Урош Стаматовић; born November 9, 1976) is a Serbian retired professional footballer and coach. He is the head coach of Serbian White Eagles FC of the Canadian Soccer League.

Career

Playing career 
Stamatović began his career in 1992 in the First League of FR Yugoslavia with FK Borac Čačak. Throughout his time in the top tier, he played with Mladost Lučani, Sloboda Užice, and Hajduk Kula. In total, Stamatović played over 200 first-league matches and scored over 30 goals. In 2007, he went abroad to Canada to play with the Serbian White Eagles in the Canadian Soccer League. He made his debut on June 17, 2007 against Trois-Rivières Attak.

Throughout his time with Serbia he won two International Division titles, and the CSL Championship. He also featured in the 2009 CSL Championship against Trois-Rivières Attak, but the Serbian White Eagles were defeated 3-2 in a penalty shootout. In 2011, he retired from competitive football.

Coaching career 
Upon retiring in 2011, Stamatović became the assistant coach of the Serbian White Eagles. In 2012, he was promoted to head coach. He was assistant coach again in 2016 and was promoted to head coach in 2017. After a year-long break, he led the Serbian White Eagles as head coach once again from 2018 to 2021. After a season with Zoran Rajović in charge, Stamatović once again became head coach in 2022.

Honours

Player
Serbian White Eagles
 Canadian Soccer League: 2008
 Canadian Soccer League International Division: 2007, 2009

Manager
Serbian White Eagles
 Canadian Soccer League: 2016 (assistant coach)
 Canadian Soccer League Regular Season: 2022

References 

1976 births
Living people
People from Požega, Serbia
Canadian Soccer League (1998–present) players
Expatriate soccer players in Canada
Association football midfielders
Serbian expatriate footballers
Serbian footballers
FK Borac Čačak players
FK Hajduk Kula players
Serbian SuperLiga players
Serbian White Eagles FC players
Serbian White Eagles FC managers
Canadian Soccer League (1998–present) managers
Serbian football managers